The Astruc family are a Sephardic Jewish family from Avignon, France. The family has produced several Rabbis, physicians, journalists, and Talmudists who have been prominent throughout France. The founder of the modern family is Israel bar Joshua Astruc who in 1666 moved his family to Bordeaux, France, where they reside today.

Members 

Israel bar Joshua Astruc – French Rabbi.
 Jean Astruc – French professor of Medicine, those family converted to Catholicism. 
Élie-Aristide Astruc – Grand Rabbi of Belgium. 
 Gabriel Astruc –  French journalist.
Alexandre Astruc - French film critic.

References 

Jewish families
Sephardi families
Sephardic surnames
French Sephardi Jews